Guy Bujold, is the former President and CEO of CANARIE Inc, and former President of the Canadian Space Agency, appointed January 1, 2008. He was succeeded on September 2, 2008, by Steve MacLean.  Guy Bujold was appointed Interim Chairperson of the Civilian Review and Complaints Commission for the RCMP in September 2017.

Prior to his appointment as the CSA President, he held various positions in numerous departments within the government of Canada including Industry Canada, Infrastructure Canada, Fisheries and Oceans Canada, the Department of Finance, Treasury Board Secretariat, Health Canada, Privy Council Office. He worked for the government of Ontario, prior to his federal career. He has also provided strategic policy, government relation and communications advice to public, para-public and private sector clients.

Guy Bujold has also been active in the volunteer sector as a member and Chair of the board of the Children's Hospital of Eastern Ontario Research Institute.

Bujold earned a master's degree in Economics from York University.

External links
Industry Canada profile

Presidents of the Canadian Space Agency
York University alumni
Place of birth missing (living people)
Year of birth missing (living people)
Living people